Coleophora fuscoaenea is a moth of the family Coleophoridae. It is found in Israel and Egypt.

The length of the forewings is 6.5–9 mm for males and 6–7 mm for females. Adults are on wing from March to April.

References

fuscoaenea
Moths described in 1952
Moths of Asia
Moths of Africa